The 2003–04 New Jersey Devils season was the 30th season for the National Hockey League franchise that was established on June 11, 1974, and 22nd season since the franchise relocated from Colorado prior to the 1982–83 NHL season.

Like the 2001–02 NHL season, the Devils finished 6th in the Eastern Conference and were eliminated in the first round of the playoffs. The team started the season really impressive, winning 17 of their first 30 games. However, in the 2004 calendar year, they were 24–19–4–1, causing them to finish sixth in the conference, second in the division and lose to one of their division rivals, the Philadelphia Flyers in five games in the quarterfinals. They were also marred by injured defenseman Scott Stevens and Brian Rafalski which also caused them to be eliminated in the first round of the playoffs.

Regular season
The defending Stanley Cup champions, the Devils only allowed 164 goals, the lowest total ever allowed by a team under the 82-game regular-season format. The Devils also shut out their opponents 14 times, a league-high. Furthermore, they were the most disciplined team in the League, finishing with the regular season with the fewest power-play opportunities against (266) and the fewest power-play goals allowed (39).

 March 23, 2004 - In an overtime victory over the Florida Panthers, Martin Brodeur earned his 400th career victory. At the time, he was the youngest goalie to win 400 career games.

Final standings

Playoffs

Eastern Conference Quarterfinals

(E6) New Jersey Devils vs. (E3) Philadelphia Flyers 
The series opened at Wachovia Center in Philadelphia, and the Flyers won both games 1 and 2 3-2 over New Jersey. Games three and four were played at Continental Airlines Arena in New Jersey. The Devils won game three 4-2, but the Flyers were victorious in game four by a score of 3-0. Game five was played back in Philadelphia, and the Flyers won that game 3-1 and won the series 4 games to 1.

Schedule and results

Preseason

|- align="center" bgcolor=#FFBBBB
| 1|| September 19 || 6–1 || Philadelphia Flyers || Wachovia Center || 0–1–0
|- align="center" bgcolor=#CCFFCC
| 2|| September 23 || 3–0 || Philadelphia Flyers  || Sovereign Bank Arena || 1–1–0
|- align="center" bgcolor=#FFBBBB
| 3|| September 24 || 2–1 || New York Islanders || Continental Airlines Arena || 1–2–0
|- align="center" bgcolor=#FFBBBB
| 4|| September 26 || 4–5 (OT) || Philadelphia Flyers || Wachovia Center || 1–3–0
|- align="center" bgcolor=#CCFFCC
| 5|| September 27 || 4–2 || Philadelphia Flyers || Continental Airlines Arena || 2–3–0
|- align="center" bgcolor=#FFBBBB
| 6|| September 30 || 1–0 || Boston Bruins || Dunkin' Donuts Center || 2–4–0
|- align="center" bgcolor=#CCFFCC
| 7|| October 1 || 4–2 || New York Rangers || Madison Square Garden || 3–4–0
|- align="center" bgcolor=#FFBBBB
| 8|| October 3 || 2–0 || New York Rangers || Continental Airlines Arena || 3–5–0
|- align="center" bgcolor=#FFBBBB
| 9|| October 4 || 5–1 || New York Islanders || Nassau Veterans Memorial Coliseum || 3–6–0
|-

|-
| Legend:

Regular season

|- align="center"
|1||T||October 8, 2003||3–3 OT|| align="left"| @ Boston Bruins (2003–04) ||0–0–1–0||1 || 
|- align="center" bgcolor="#CCFFCC"
|2||W||October 11, 2003||2–1 || align="left"| @ Carolina Hurricanes (2003–04) ||1–0–1–0||3 || 
|- align="center"
|3||T||October 16, 2003||2–2 OT|| align="left"|  Toronto Maple Leafs (2003–04) ||1–0–2–0||4 || 
|- align="center" bgcolor="#FFBBBB"
|4||L||October 18, 2003||2–3 || align="left"|  Tampa Bay Lightning (2003–04) ||1–1–2–0||4 || 
|- align="center" bgcolor="#FFBBBB"
|5||L||October 22, 2003||1–2 || align="left"|  Florida Panthers (2003–04) ||1–2–2–0||4 || 
|- align="center" bgcolor="#CCFFCC"
|6||W||October 24, 2003||2–1 || align="left"| @ Pittsburgh Penguins (2003–04) ||2–2–2–0||6 || 
|- align="center" bgcolor="#FFBBBB"
|7||L||October 25, 2003||2–5 || align="left"|  Boston Bruins (2003–04) ||2–3–2–0||6 || 
|- align="center" bgcolor="#CCFFCC"
|8||W||October 28, 2003||4–0 || align="left"| @ New York Islanders (2003–04) ||3–3–2–0||8 || 
|- align="center" bgcolor="#CCFFCC"
|9||W||October 30, 2003||3–2 || align="left"|  Philadelphia Flyers (2003–04) ||4–3–2–0||10 || 
|-

|- align="center" bgcolor="#CCFFCC"
|10||W||November 1, 2003||4–3 || align="left"|  Colorado Avalanche (2003–04) ||5–3–2–0||12 || 
|- align="center" bgcolor="#CCFFCC"
|11||W||November 5, 2003||3–2 OT|| align="left"|  San Jose Sharks (2003–04) ||6–3–2–0||14 || 
|- align="center"
|12||T||November 7, 2003||1–1 OT|| align="left"|  Toronto Maple Leafs (2003–04) ||6–3–3–0||15 || 
|- align="center" bgcolor="#CCFFCC"
|13||W||November 8, 2003||1–0 || align="left"| @ Ottawa Senators (2003–04) ||7–3–3–0||17 || 
|- align="center"
|14||T||November 12, 2003||2–2 OT|| align="left"| @ Buffalo Sabres (2003–04) ||7–3–4–0||18 || 
|- align="center" bgcolor="#CCFFCC"
|15||W||November 13, 2003||3–1 || align="left"|  Florida Panthers (2003–04) ||8–3–4–0||20 || 
|- align="center" bgcolor="#CCFFCC"
|16||W||November 15, 2003||5–0 || align="left"|  New York Rangers (2003–04) ||9–3–4–0||22 || 
|- align="center" bgcolor="#CCFFCC"
|17||W||November 19, 2003||4–1 || align="left"|  Buffalo Sabres (2003–04) ||10–3–4–0||24 || 
|- align="center" bgcolor="#CCFFCC"
|18||W||November 21, 2003||2–1 OT|| align="left"|  Pittsburgh Penguins (2003–04) ||11–3–4–0||26 || 
|- align="center" bgcolor="#CCFFCC"
|19||W||November 25, 2003||4–0 || align="left"| @ Los Angeles Kings (2003–04) ||12–3–4–0||28 || 
|- align="center"
|20||T||November 26, 2003||3–3 OT|| align="left"| @ Mighty Ducks of Anaheim (2003–04) ||12–3–5–0||29 || 
|- align="center" bgcolor="#FFBBBB"
|21||L||November 28, 2003||0–2 || align="left"| @ Dallas Stars (2003–04) ||12–4–5–0||29 || 
|- align="center"
|22||T||November 30, 2003||1–1 OT|| align="left"| @ Colorado Avalanche (2003–04) ||12–4–6–0||30 || 
|-

|- align="center" bgcolor="#FFBBBB"
|23||L||December 2, 2003||1–3 || align="left"|  Phoenix Coyotes (2003–04) ||12–5–6–0||30 || 
|- align="center" bgcolor="#CCFFCC"
|24||W||December 4, 2003||3–0 || align="left"|  Washington Capitals (2003–04) ||13–5–6–0||31 || 
|- align="center" bgcolor="#CCFFCC"
|25||W||December 6, 2003||2–1 || align="left"| @ Ottawa Senators (2003–04) ||14–5–6–0||33 || 
|- align="center" bgcolor="#CCFFCC"
|26||W||December 10, 2003||1–0 OT|| align="left"|  New York Islanders (2003–04) ||15–5–6–0||35 || 
|- align="center"
|27||T||December 12, 2003||3–3 OT|| align="left"|  Philadelphia Flyers (2003–04) ||15–5–7–0||36 || 
|- align="center" bgcolor="#CCFFCC"
|28||W||December 13, 2003||2–0 || align="left"| @ Philadelphia Flyers (2003–04) ||16–5–7–0||38 || 
|- align="center" bgcolor="#FFBBBB"
|29||L||December 16, 2003||4–5 || align="left"| @ New York Islanders (2003–04) ||16–6–7–0||38 || 
|- align="center" bgcolor="#CCFFCC"
|30||W||December 18, 2003||3–0 || align="left"| @ Atlanta Thrashers (2003–04) ||17–6–7–0||40 || 
|- align="center" bgcolor="#CCFFCC"
|31||W||December 19, 2003||5–2 || align="left"| @ Buffalo Sabres (2003–04) ||18–6–7–0||42 || 
|- align="center"
|32||T||December 21, 2003||2–2 OT|| align="left"| @ Chicago Blackhawks (2003–04) ||18–6–8–0||43 || 
|- align="center" bgcolor="#FF6F6F"
|33||OTL||December 26, 2003||3–4 OT|| align="left"|  New York Islanders (2003–04) ||18–6–8–1||44 || 
|- align="center" bgcolor="#CCFFCC"
|34||W||December 27, 2003||2–0 || align="left"| @ Pittsburgh Penguins (2003–04) ||19–6–8–1||46 || 
|- align="center" bgcolor="#FFBBBB"
|35||L||December 29, 2003||1–3 || align="left"| @ New York Islanders (2003–04) ||19–7–8–1||46 || 
|-

|- align="center"
|36||T||January 1, 2004||2–2 OT|| align="left"| @ Washington Capitals (2003–04) ||19–7–9–1||47 || 
|- align="center" bgcolor="#FFBBBB"
|37||L||January 3, 2004||2–3 || align="left"| @ Nashville Predators (2003–04) ||19–8–9–1||47 || 
|- align="center" bgcolor="#CCFFCC"
|38||W||January 5, 2004||3–2 OT|| align="left"|  Edmonton Oilers (2003–04) ||20–8–9–1||49 || 
|- align="center" bgcolor="#FFBBBB"
|39||L||January 7, 2004||2–4 || align="left"|  Pittsburgh Penguins (2003–04) ||20–9–9–1||49 || 
|- align="center" bgcolor="#FFBBBB"
|40||L||January 9, 2004||1–4 || align="left"|  Tampa Bay Lightning (2003–04) ||20–10–9–1||49 || 
|- align="center" bgcolor="#CCFFCC"
|41||W||January 10, 2004||1–0 || align="left"| @ Toronto Maple Leafs (2003–04) ||21–10–9–1||51 || 
|- align="center" bgcolor="#FFBBBB"
|42||L||January 13, 2004||0–4 || align="left"|  Ottawa Senators (2003–04) ||21–11–9–1||51 || 
|- align="center"
|43||T||January 15, 2004||3–3 OT|| align="left"| @ New York Rangers (2003–04) ||21–11–10–1||52 || 
|- align="center" bgcolor="#CCFFCC"
|44||W||January 17, 2004||2–1 OT|| align="left"|  Washington Capitals (2003–04) ||22–11–10–1||54 || 
|- align="center" bgcolor="#CCFFCC"
|45||W||January 20, 2004||3–0 || align="left"| @ Pittsburgh Penguins (2003–04) ||23–11–10–1||56 || 
|- align="center" bgcolor="#FFBBBB"
|46||L||January 21, 2004||1–2 || align="left"|  Carolina Hurricanes (2003–04) ||23–12–10–1||56 || 
|- align="center" bgcolor="#CCFFCC"
|47||W||January 23, 2004||2–0 || align="left"|  Montreal Canadiens (2003–04) ||24–12–10–1||58 || 
|- align="center" bgcolor="#CCFFCC"
|48||W||January 25, 2004||3–2 || align="left"|  Atlanta Thrashers (2003–04) ||25–12–10–1||61 || 
|- align="center" bgcolor="#CCFFCC"
|49||W||January 27, 2004||4–3 || align="left"| @ Columbus Blue Jackets (2003–04) ||26–12–10–1||63 || 
|- align="center" bgcolor="#FFBBBB"
|50||L||January 29, 2004||2–5 || align="left"| @ Detroit Red Wings (2003–04) ||26–13–10–1||63 || 
|- align="center" bgcolor="#CCFFCC"
|51||W||January 31, 2004||4–1 || align="left"| @ St. Louis Blues (2003–04) ||27–13–10–1||65 || 
|-

|- align="center" bgcolor="#CCFFCC"
|52||W||February 3, 2004||2–1 || align="left"|  Ottawa Senators (2003–04) ||28–13–10–1||67 || 
|- align="center" bgcolor="#FFBBBB"
|53||L||February 5, 2004||0–4 || align="left"|  Vancouver Canucks (2003–04) ||28–14–10–1|| 67 || 
|- align="center" bgcolor="#FFBBBB"
|54||L||February 10, 2004||1–4 || align="left"| @ Philadelphia Flyers (2003–04) ||28–15–10–1|| 67 || 
|- align="center" bgcolor="#FFBBBB"
|55||L||February 11, 2004||1–3 || align="left"|  New York Rangers (2003–04) ||28–16–10–1|| 67 || 
|- align="center" bgcolor="#CCFFCC"
|56||W||February 14, 2004||4–1 || align="left"|  Carolina Hurricanes (2003–04) ||29–16–10–1||69 || 
|- align="center" bgcolor="#CCFFCC"
|57||W||February 15, 2004||3–2 OT|| align="left"|  Los Angeles Kings (2003–04) ||30–16–10–1||71 || 
|- align="center"
|58||T||February 17, 2004||4–4 OT|| align="left"|  Minnesota Wild (2003–04) ||30–16–11–1|| 72 || 
|- align="center" bgcolor="#FFBBBB"
|59||L||February 19, 2004||1–3 || align="left"| @ Washington Capitals (2003–04) ||30–17–11–1|| 72 || 
|- align="center" bgcolor="#CCFFCC"
|60||W||February 21, 2004||7–3 || align="left"| @ New York Rangers (2003–04) ||31–17–11–1|| 74 || 
|- align="center" bgcolor="#CCFFCC"
|61||W||February 22, 2004||3–1 || align="left"|  Calgary Flames (2003–04) ||32–17–11–1|| 76 || 
|- align="center" bgcolor="#CCFFCC"
|62||W||February 25, 2004||8–2 || align="left"|  Buffalo Sabres (2003–04) ||33–17–11–1|| 78 || 
|- align="center" bgcolor="#FFBBBB"
|63||L||February 27, 2004||2–3 || align="left"|  Atlanta Thrashers (2003–04) ||33–18–11–1|| 78 || 
|- align="center" bgcolor="#FFBBBB"
|64||L||February 28, 2004||0–3 || align="left"| @ Toronto Maple Leafs (2003–04) ||33–19–11–1|| 78 || 
|-

|- align="center" bgcolor="#FFBBBB"
|65||L||March 1, 2004||1–2 || align="left"| @ Montreal Canadiens (2003–04) ||33–20–11–1|| 78 || 
|- align="center" bgcolor="#CCFFCC"
|66||W||March 3, 2004||5–2 || align="left"| @ Florida Panthers (2003–04) ||34–20–11–1|| 80 || 
|- align="center" bgcolor="#FF6F6F"
|67||OTL||March 5, 2004||2–3 OT|| align="left"| @ Tampa Bay Lightning (2003–04) ||34–20–11–2|| 81 || 
|- align="center" bgcolor="#CCFFCC"
|68||W||March 6, 2004||4–1 || align="left"| @ Carolina Hurricanes (2003–04) ||35–20–11–2|| 83 || 
|- align="center" bgcolor="#FFBBBB"
|69||L||March 9, 2004||1–3 || align="left"|  Philadelphia Flyers (2003–04) ||35–21–11–2|| 83 || 
|- align="center" bgcolor="#CCFFCC"
|70||W||March 11, 2004||6–4 || align="left"|  Chicago Blackhawks (2003–04) ||36–21–11–2|| 85 || 
|- align="center" bgcolor="#FFBBBB"
|71||L||March 13, 2004||1–2 || align="left"| @ Philadelphia Flyers (2003–04) ||36–22–11–2|| 85 || 
|- align="center" bgcolor="#CCFFCC"
|72||W||March 15, 2004||3–1 || align="left"| @ New York Rangers (2003–04) ||37–22–11–2|| 87 || 
|- align="center" bgcolor="#CCFFCC"
|73||W||March 17, 2004||6–1 || align="left"|  Pittsburgh Penguins (2003–04) ||38–22–11–2|| 89 || 
|- align="center"
|74||T||March 19, 2004||1–1 OT|| align="left"|  Montreal Canadiens (2003–04) ||38–22–12–2|| 90 || 
|- align="center" bgcolor="#FFBBBB"
|75||L||March 20, 2004||2–3 || align="left"| @ Montreal Canadiens (2003–04) ||38–23–12–2|| 90 || 
|- align="center" bgcolor="#CCFFCC"
|76||W||March 23, 2004||4–3 OT|| align="left"| @ Florida Panthers (2003–04) ||39–23–12–2|| 92 || 
|- align="center" bgcolor="#FFBBBB"
|77||L||March 25, 2004||1–2 || align="left"| @ Tampa Bay Lightning (2003–04) ||39–24–12–2|| 92 || 
|- align="center" bgcolor="#CCFFCC"
|78||W||March 26, 2004||5–0 || align="left"| @ Atlanta Thrashers (2003–04) ||40–24–12–2|| 94 || 
|- align="center" bgcolor="#CCFFCC"
|79||W||March 28, 2004||3–2 || align="left"|  New York Islanders (2003–04) ||41–24–12–2|| 96 || 
|- align="center" bgcolor="#CCFFCC"
|80||W||March 30, 2004||5–0 || align="left"|  New York Rangers (2003–04) ||42–24–12–2|| 98 || 
|-

|- align="center" bgcolor="#CCFFCC"
|81||W||April 3, 2004||5–2 || align="left"| @ Boston Bruins (2003–04) ||43–24–12–2|| 100 || 
|- align="center" bgcolor="#FFBBBB"
|82||L||April 4, 2004||1–3 || align="left"|  Boston Bruins (2003–04) ||43–25–12–2|| 100 || 
|-

|-
| Legend:

Playoffs

|- align="center" bgcolor="#FFBBBB"
| 1 || April 8 || @ Philadelphia Flyers || 2–3 || 19,608 || Flyers lead 1–0 || 
|- align="center" bgcolor="#FFBBBB"
| 2 || April 10 || @ Philadelphia Flyers || 2–3 || 19,779 || Flyers lead 2–0 || 
|- align="center" bgcolor="#CCFFCC"
| 3 || April 12 || Philadelphia Flyers || 4–2 || 18,023 || Flyers lead 2–1 || 
|- align="center" bgcolor="#FFBBBB"
| 4 || April 14 || Philadelphia Flyers || 0–3 || 19,040 || Flyers lead 3–1 || 
|- align="center" bgcolor="#FFBBBB"
| 5 || April 17 || @ Philadelphia Flyers || 1–3 || 19,778 || Flyers win 4–1 || 
|-

|-
| Legend:

Player statistics

Scoring
 Position abbreviations: C = Center; D = Defense; G = Goaltender; LW = Left Wing; RW = Right Wing
  = Joined team via a transaction (e.g., trade, waivers, signing) during the season. Stats reflect time with the Devils only.
  = Left team via a transaction (e.g., trade, waivers, release) during the season. Stats reflect time with the Devils only.

Goaltending

Awards and records

Awards
Martin Brodeur was also a finalist for the Hart Memorial Trophy and John Madden was a runner-up for the Frank J. Selke Trophy.

Milestones

Transactions
The Devils were involved in the following transactions from June 10, 2003, the day after the deciding game of the 2003 Stanley Cup Finals, through June 7, 2004, the day of the deciding game of the 2004 Stanley Cup Finals.

Trades

Players acquired

Players lost

Signings

Draft picks
The Devils' draft picks at the 2003 NHL Entry Draft at the Gaylord Entertainment Center in Nashville, Tennessee.

Media
Television coverage was still on Fox Sports Net New York with commentators Mike Emrick and Chico Resch as usual with Matt Loughlin hosting in the studio. Radio coverage remained on WABC 770 with John Hennessy calling the play-by-play with Randy Velischek providing color commentary.

See also
2003–04 NHL season

Notes

References

 
 

New Jersey Devils seasons
New Jersey Devils
New Jersey Devils
New Jersey Devils
New Jersey Devils
21st century in East Rutherford, New Jersey
Meadowlands Sports Complex